Roger Graham Holloway OBE (24 November 1933 – 31 October 2010) had many occupations during a colourful life, including: soldier, big game hunter, international wine and spirit merchant and Anglican priest. He was the youngest of six children of a civil servant. His family had a military tradition.

He was brought up in Blackheath, London and educated at Eastbourne College. For National Service he was a platoon commander in Kenya during the emergency. After that he was assistant to a professional big game hunter.

He then went to Selwyn College, Cambridge to read Theology with a view to ordination. However he had difficulties with his faith at that time and joined Pfizer as a salesman and brand manager. In 1960 he moved to the advertising agency Robert Sharp and Partners running the Players and Unilever accounts. In 1963 went into the wine business of Charrington United Breweries Group (later Bass Charrington). He then moved to Jardine Matheson where, from 1982 to 1988 he was managing director of wines and spirits. This was one of the most profitable divisions of Jardine Matheson with the majority of its revenues derived from sales to Japan. Holloway lived in Japan for some years and developed this growing division for Jardine's.

Meanwhile, he had been ordained in 1981, as a protégé of Robert Runcie. In Asia in addition to his work with Jardine Matheson he served as honorary chaplain at St. John's Cathedral (Hong Kong), as honorary assistant at M, Tokyo, and as Episcopalian Chaplain at the US military base at Camp Zama.

In 1988 he settled in London and became a full-time priest at St Margaret's, Westminster and also appeals director of the Imperial Cancer Research Fund and Director of the Industrial Christian Fellowship. In 1997 he was elected Preacher to Gray's Inn, continuing until his death. Also in 1997 he was appointed OBE "for services to the whisky industry". With this description, The Queen was surprised to see him in clerical dress.

He married in 1962, Anne Alsop, who survives him with three sons and a daughter.

References

1933 births
2010 deaths
20th-century English Anglican priests
Alumni of Selwyn College, Cambridge
Officers of the Order of the British Empire
People educated at Eastbourne College